Luceafărul Theatre is a public theatre in Iași, Romania, specializing in plays for families and young audiences.

History
Founded in 1949, as the Puppet Theatre, it became, in 1973, the Theatre for Children and Youth. In 1987, the institution was renamed Luceafărul Theatre.

Every year, in October, the venue hosts the "International Theatre Festival for Young Audience" (FITPT) (Romanian: "Festivalul Internațional de Teatru pentru Publicul Tânăr").

See also
Luceafăr
Luceafărul (poem)

References

External links

Official website
A romantic story of the building at Curierul de Iași (The Courier of Iași)

Theatre
Theatre
Modernist architecture in Romania
Theatres in Iași
Iasi
Iasi
Theatres completed in 1987
Event venues established in 1949
1949 establishments in Romania